The 2020–21 AS Nancy Lorraine season was the club's 54th season in existence and its fourth consecutive season in the second flight of French football. In addition to the domestic league, Nancy participated in this season's edition of the Coupe de France. The season covered the period from 1 July 2020 to 30 June 2021.

Players

First-team squad

Transfers

In

Out

Pre-season and friendlies

Competitions

Overview

Ligue 2

League table

Results summary

Results by round

Matches
The league fixtures were announced on 9 July 2020.

Coupe de France

Statistics

Goalscorers

References

External links

AS Nancy Lorraine seasons
Nancy